Mileševo may refer to:

 Mileševo (Bečej), a village in municipality of Bečej, Serbia
 Mileševo (Prijepolje), a village in municipality of Prijepolje, Serbia
 Mileševo Monastery, a monastery near Prijepolje (Serbia)

See also 
 Miloševo (disambiguation)
 Maleševo (disambiguation)
 Mališevo, a settlement